Schlitt is a German language habitational surname. Notable people with the name include:

 Heinrich Schlitt (1849–1923), German painter and illustrator
 John Schlitt (1950), American musician
 Martin Schlitt (1966), German wheelchair curler

References 

German-language surnames
German toponymic surnames